"Window Shopper" is a single by rapper 50 Cent. It was released in November 2005 as the second single (in the U.S.) and first single (in the UK and Australia) from the Get Rich or Die Tryin' soundtrack released in 2005, as well as the film's theme song. It was later included on his 2005 album, The Massacre as a bonus track. It peaked at number 20 on the Billboard Hot 100, and had slightly more success in a couple of other countries. The song was certified Gold by the RIAA.

Music video
The music video is set in Monaco and Cannes. It’s about how 50 Cent and friends are rich enough to buy overpriced items, such as $400 cheeseburgers, and a $1,500,000 Maserati MC12. It received a nomination at the 2006 MTV Video Music Awards for Best Rap Video. There are two versions of the video: one which contains several clips from the film and one that doesn't and is the full version of the video. For example, the video either starts with footage from the film of Marcus looking through a window at shoes, or it starts with 50 Cent and Mase trying to understand what a French shoe salesman is saying. The video features cameo appearances by other G-Unit members,  M.O.P., Ma$e, Mobb Deep and Olivia.

Charts and certifications

Weekly charts

Year-end charts

Certifications

|}

Parodies
 Lily Allen recorded a parody of "Window Shopper" called "Nan, You're a Window Shopper", about her grandmother. The version of this song is on the U.S. release of her album Alright, Still.
 Loon parodied the song in a diss to Ma$e.
 Gazouza Setif recorded a parody of "Window Shopper"

Remix
There is also a Window Shopper remix featuring Ma$e. It was released in the mixtape: "G-Unit Radio part 16" with Ma$e.

A second remix was released featuring Ma$e and Lloyd Banks. It was released in the mixtape: "Statik Selektah & G-Unit Radio -
The Empire Strikes Back". This version has a different chorus sung by 50 Cent, instead of him saying "Ja you's a window shopper" he says "nigga you's a window shopper".

In 2015 Post Malone released a remix of the song titled '#mood'. The remix "addresses the peskiest of haters: those from the Internet."

Sample
"Window Shopper" samples "Burnin' and Lootin'" by Bob Marley

References

External links

2005 singles
50 Cent songs
Music videos directed by Benny Boom
Songs written for films
Songs written by Bob Marley
Songs written by 50 Cent